Dialectics of Nature is an unfinished 1883 work by Friedrich Engels that applies Marxist ideas – particularly those of dialectical materialism – to nature.

History and contents
Engels wrote most of the manuscript between 1872 and 1882, which was a melange of German, French and English notations on the contemporary development of science and technology; however, it was not published within his lifetime. In later times, Eduard Bernstein passed the manuscripts to Albert Einstein, who thought the science confused (particularly the mathematics and physics) but the overall work worthy of a broader readership. After that in 1925, the Marx–Engels–Lenin Institute in Moscow published the manuscripts (a bilingual German/Russian edition).

The biologist J. B. S. Haldane wrote a preface for the work in 1939, "Hence it is often hard to follow if one does not know the history of the scientific practice of that time. The idea of what is now called the conservation of energy was beginning to permeate physics, astronomy, chemistry, geoscience, and biology, but it was still very incompletely realised, and still more incompletely applied. Words such as 'force', 'motion', and 'vis viva' were used where we should now speak of energy".

Some then controversial topics of Engels' day, pertaining to incomplete or faulty theories, are now settled, making some of Engels' essays dated. "Their interest lies not so much in their detailed criticism of theories, but in showing how Engels grappled with intellectual problems".

One "law" proposed in the Dialectics of Nature is the "law of the transformation of quantity into quality and vice versa". Probably the most commonly cited example of this is the change of water from a liquid to a gas, by increasing its temperature (although Engels also describes other examples from chemistry). In contemporary science, this process is known as a phase transition. There has also been an effort to apply this mechanism to social phenomena, whereby increases in population result in changes in social structure.

Dialectics and its study was derived from the philosopher and author of Science of Logic, G. W. F. Hegel, who, in turn, had studied the Greek philosopher Heraclitus. Heraclitus taught that everything was constantly changing and that all things consisted of two opposite elements which changed into each other as night changes into day, light into darkness, life into death etc.

Engels's work develops from the comments he had made about science in Anti-Dühring.  It includes the famous "The Part Played by Labour in the Transition from Ape to Man", which has also been published separately as a pamphlet.  Engels argues that the hand and brain grew together, an idea supported by later fossil discoveries (see Australopithecus afarensis#Bipedalism).

Most of the work is fragmentary and in the form of rough notes, as shown in this quotation from the section entitled  "Biology":

See also
 Natural philosophy
 Naturphilosophie

Notes and references

External links
 Full text on-line.
 Dialectics of Nature, PDF of edition published by Progress Publishers.

1883 non-fiction books
Marxist books
Books by Friedrich Engels
Dialectical materialism